European 2000 Airlines was an airline based in Luqa, Malta. It operated scheduled services between Malta and Sicily. Its main base was Malta International Airport, with hubs at Vincenzo Florio Airport, Trapani and Catania-Fontanarossa Airport.

History
The airline started operations in September 2005. It was planning to launch scheduled services from Trapani to Malta and Tunis.

Fleet
The European 2000 Airlines fleet includes the following aircraft (at March 2007):
2 Fairchild Metro 23

References

External links

Official website

Defunct airlines of Malta
Airlines established in 2005
Airlines disestablished in 2013
2005 establishments in Malta